Thomas Stephen Gorzelanny (born July 12, 1982) is a former American professional baseball pitcher who is currently the pitching coach for the minor league Amarillo Sod Poodles. He played in Major League Baseball (MLB) for the Pittsburgh Pirates, Chicago Cubs, Washington Nationals, Milwaukee Brewers, Detroit Tigers and Cleveland Indians.

Early life
Tom Gorzelanny was born to Susan and Bob Gorzelanny in Evergreen Park, Illinois and grew up in Chicago and Oak Forest, Illinois. He graduated from Marist High School in 2000.

Professional career

Pittsburgh Pirates
Gorzelanny was drafted in the 38th round of the 2000 MLB Draft by the Chicago White Sox but chose to play college baseball rather than immediately pursuing a professional career. He redshirted in his first year at University of Kansas and posted 3–7 record with a 5.90 earned run average as a freshman with the Kansas Jayhawks. Gorzelanny was ruled academically ineligible prior to his sophomore season and transferred to Triton College, a community college in Illinois. He was drafted from Triton in the second round (45th overall) of the 2003 MLB Draft by the Pittsburgh Pirates.

He made his Major League debut with the Pirates in September, starting against the Houston Astros and pitching  innings, receiving the loss. At the beginning of the  season, he was optioned to Triple-A Indianapolis Indians. Gorzelanny was selected to play for the US team in the 2006 All-Star Futures Game, but was ineligible due to being called up by the Pirates. On June 29, 2006, the Pirates called Gorzelanny up to replace Oliver Pérez in the starting rotation. He made his season debut on July 1, 2006 against the Detroit Tigers. In 11 games, he was 2–5 with a 3.79 ERA.

Gorzelanny earned a regular spot in the rotation in the  season. He was one of five players in the National League that would be chosen from a final fan vote for the last spot on the NL roster for the 2007 MLB All-Star Game. Gorzelanny went on to compile a 14–10 season for the Pirates, leading the Pirates in wins and finishing with over 200 innings and an ERA of 3.88.

In , Gorzelanny suffered from control problems with his pitches, walking 61 batters and giving up 99 hits in his first  innings of work.  After a difficult start to the first half of the season, Gorzelanny was optioned to Triple-A Indianapolis in July. He was recalled to Pittsburgh several weeks later after a successful tenure in Indianapolis, but ultimately failed to regain his 2007 form. He finished the 2008 season 6–9 with a 6.66 ERA.

After Spring Training, Gorzelanny began the  season at Triple-A Indianapolis. In May, he was recalled to pitch from the bullpen after injuries to the Pirates' roster. He was optioned back to Triple-A after several weeks with Pittsburgh. In nine appearances with Pittsburgh, he was 3–1 with a 5.19 ERA.

Chicago Cubs

Gorzelanny was traded on July 30, 2009 to the Chicago Cubs along with John Grabow for Kevin Hart, José Ascanio, and minor league third baseman Josh Harrison, and assigned to the Chicago Cubs Triple-A affiliate, the Iowa Cubs. He was called up to start on August 4, 2009, and got his first win as a Cub. He went on to make seven starts for the Cubs, earning a record of 4–2 and ending the season in the bullpen. Between the Pirates and the Cubs, he was 7–3 with a 5.55 ERA in 2009.

In , Gorzelanny won a spot in the Cubs starting rotation. In late May, he was moved to the bullpen to accommodate the return of Carlos Zambrano to the Cubs rotation. On June 26, 2010, Cubs manager Lou Piniella announced that Zambrano would move back to the bullpen, and Gorzelanny would regain a spot in the Cubs rotation. Even after Zambrano made his second return to the rotation after undergoing anger management therapy, Gorzelanny kept his spot in the rotation. In 29 appearances, including 23 starts, in 2010, he was 7–9 with a 4.09 ERA.

Washington Nationals
On January 17, 2011, the Washington Nationals acquired Gorzelanny from the Cubs for prospects Michael Burgess, A. J. Morris, and Graham Hicks. Gorzelanny became expendable to the Cubs after they traded for Matt Garza ten days earlier.

On May 28, 2011, Gorzelanny was placed on the 15-day disabled list with left elbow inflammation. After coming off the DL, he was less consistent and was removed from the rotation, and was used in long relief out of the bullpen. He started in 15 games for the Nationals and pitched in 15 more in 2011, compiling a 4–6 record and a 4.03 ERA.

In 2012, Gorzelanny pitched almost exclusively out of the Nationals bullpen; he started one game, the second to last game of the season, and received a no decision. In 45 appearances in 2012, 44 of them out of the bullpen, Gorzelanny was 4–2 with a 2.88 ERA over 72 innings.

Milwaukee Brewers

On December 20, 2012, the Milwaukee Brewers and Gorzelanny agreed to a two-year contract. The deal became official on December 21, 2012. As of the 2013 All-Star Break, Gorzelanny was having the best season of his career, statistically speaking. He entered the break with a 1.88 ERA in 35 appearances, three of them starts.

Detroit Tigers
On January 6, 2015, Gorzelanny signed a one-year contract with the Detroit Tigers. He was designated for assignment by the Tigers on July 3. Gorzelanny gave up 17 runs on 32 hits over 24 innings, walking 15 and striking out 19. Opponents batted .390 on balls put in play. On July 8, he was outrighted to the Triple-A Toledo Mud Hens.

Cleveland Indians
Gorzelanny signed a minor league contract, that included an invitation to major league spring training, with the Cleveland Indians in December 2015. He opened the 2016 season with the Columbus Clippers, and was promoted to the major leagues on June 1. He was designated for assignment on July 4 and subsequently outrighted to Columbus on July 8. On July 9, Gorzelanny declined the outright assignment and became a free agent.

Baltimore Orioles
On July 24, 2016, the Baltimore Orioles signed Gorzelanny to a minor league contract. He was released on August 13, 2016.

New York Mets
On February 3, 2017 the New York Mets signed Gorzelanny to a minor league contract. He elected free agency on November 6, 2017.

Coaching career
On January 28, 2019, Gorzelanny was named pitching coach of the University of Iowa Hawkeyes baseball team  and remained there until 2022. He joined the Arizona Diamondbacks' farm system not long after.

Pitching style
Gorzelanny features five pitches: a four-seam fastball (89–92), a two-seam fastball (89–92), a changeup (84–86), a slider (79–82), and a curveball (78–81). Right-handed hitters see mostly a combination of the two-seamer and changeup, while left-handers see a mix of all of his pitches except the changeup.

Personal life
Gorzelanny and his wife, Lindsey, welcomed their first child, a son named Gavin, on May 21, 2010.

References

External links

1982 births
Living people
People from Evergreen Park, Illinois
Major League Baseball pitchers
Baseball players from Chicago
Pittsburgh Pirates players
Chicago Cubs players
Washington Nationals players
Milwaukee Brewers players
Detroit Tigers players
Cleveland Indians players
Kansas Jayhawks baseball players
Triton Trojans baseball players
Indianapolis Indians players
Hickory Crawdads players
Lynchburg Hillcats players
Altoona Curve players
Williamsport Crosscutters players
Nashville Sounds players
Toledo Mud Hens players
Columbus Clippers players
People from Oak Forest, Illinois
Las Vegas 51s players
Iowa Hawkeyes baseball coaches
St. Cloud River Bats players